The Bihai Power Plant is a hydroelectric power plant in Xiulin Township, Hualien County, Taiwan.

History
The geological survey and exploratory drilling for the project were started in 1996 and construction was started in 2001. After 15 years of preparatory and construction work, the power plant went into commercial operation on 10 December 2011.

Dam and reservoir
The power plant was established from the construction of concrete gravity dam at an altitude of 545 meters along the Hoping River basin in Hualien County. The dam at  created a reservoir with a capacity of 635,000 m3. An intake valve was built connecting the dam with a 6,549 meter long headrace tunnel to Bihai Power Plant located at the downstream side at an altitude of 100 meters where a vertical Pelton turbine of 61.2 MW is installed.

Generation
The power plant is expected to generate 237 GWh every year to residents of Hualien County to relieve the previous burden for Taipower to import electricity from Mingtan Pumped Storage Hydro Power Plant in Nantou County and Maanshan Nuclear Power Plant in Pingtung County which was very costly. The 18 hours of daily water capture and storage will generate enough electricity to supply the six hours of peak load in the region.

Safety
The power plant will open the floodgate to release excessive water during high river intensity to prevent the buildup of sediment.

Financing
The project costed NT$ 16.5 billion.

See also

 List of power stations in Taiwan
 Electricity sector in Taiwan

References

2011 establishments in Taiwan
Buildings and structures in Hualien County
Dams completed in 2011
Energy infrastructure completed in 2011
Hydroelectric power stations in Taiwan